1295 Deflotte, provisional designation , is a carbonaceous asteroid from the outer regions of the asteroid belt, approximately 48 kilometers in diameter. It was discovered on 25 November 1933, by French astronomer Louis Boyer at the Algiers Observatory in Algeria, North Africa. The asteroid was named after the discoverer's nephew.

Orbit and classification 

Deflotte is a non-family asteroid from the main belt's background population. It orbits the Sun in the outer main-belt at a distance of 3.0–3.8 AU once every 6 years and 3 months (2,281 days). Its orbit has an eccentricity of 0.12 and an inclination of 3° with respect to the ecliptic.

The body's observation arc begins with its official discovery observation at Algiers in November 1933.

Physical characteristics 

Deflotte is an assumed carbonaceous C-type asteroid.

Rotation period 

In September 2007, a rotational lightcurve of Deflotte was obtained from photometric observations by French amateur astronomer René Roy. Lightcurve analysis gave a rotation period of 14.64 hours with a brightness amplitude of 0.16 magnitude.

Diameter and albedo 

According to the surveys carried out by the Infrared Astronomical Satellite IRAS, the Japanese Akari satellite and the NEOWISE mission of NASA's Wide-field Infrared Survey Explorer, Deflotte measures between 45.67 and 51.048 kilometers in diameter and its surface has an albedo between 0.0390 and 0.049. The Collaborative Asteroid Lightcurve Link derives an albedo of 0.0402 and a diameter of 47.99 kilometers based on an absolute magnitude of 10.7.

Naming 

This minor planet was named after Louis Boyer's nephew. The official naming citation was mentioned in The Names of the Minor Planets by Paul Herget in 1955.

References

External links 
 Asteroid Lightcurve Database (LCDB), query form (info )
 Dictionary of Minor Planet Names, Google books
 Asteroids and comets rotation curves, CdR – Observatoire de Genève, Raoul Behrend
 [httpw://www.minorplanetcenter.net/iau/lists/NumberedMPs000001.html Discovery Circumstances: Numbered Minor Planets (1)-(5000)] – Minor Planet Center
 
 

001295
Discoveries by Louis Boyer (astronomer)
Named minor planets
19331125